The Lechería Limestone is a geologic formation in Chiapas, Mexico. The shallow reefal biomicrite and mud-supported oolitic and pelletoidal biosparite limestones preserve fossils dating back to the Paleogene period.

See also 
 List of fossiliferous stratigraphic units in Mexico
 Klondike Mountain Formation
 Nanjemoy Formation
 Bogotá Formation

References

Further reading 
 S. H. Frost and R. L. Langenheim, Jr. 1974. Cenozoic Reef Biofacies. Chicago, Northern Illinois University Press 1-388

Geologic formations of Mexico
Paleogene Mexico
Ypresian Stage
Wasatchian
Bridgerian
Limestone formations
Reef deposits
Paleontology in Mexico
Geography of Chiapas